Parapoynx moriutii is a moth in the family Crambidae. It was described by Yoshiyasu in 2005. It is found in Japan.

References

Acentropinae
Moths described in 2005
Moths of Japan